Elmer Rosenberg (1885 – April 1951) was an American politician and labor leader from New York.

Life
He was born in Újpest, which is now a district of Budapest, Hungary, and attended the public schools there. He emigrated to the United States in 1900, and became a cloth cutter in New York City. He graduated from Rand School of Social Science. He was President of Local 10 of the Amalgamated Ladies' Garment Cutters Union; and President of the Joint Board of the Cloak, Skirt and Reefer Makers' Union. He led several garment workers' strikes and frequently took part in negotiations of wages and working conditions between garment unions and manufacturers.

He was a Socialist member of the New York State Assembly (New York Co., 6th D.) in 1918.

In 1920, he left New York City and moved to Lake Huntington, Sullivan County, New York, where he bought a boarding house. He married Rose Braverman.

His son, Robert Rosenberg, (b. 1925) was a history teacher and hotel owner. His daughter Esterita "Cissie" (Rosenberg) Blumberg (1928–2004) published a book of memoirs: Remember the Catskills: Tales of a Recovering Hotelkeeper (1997).

Sources
 NEW PROTOCOL ENDS NEEDLE STRIKE FEAR in NYT on July 5, 1915
 CLOAKMAKERS ASK 20 PER CENT. RISE in NYT on June 17, 1917
 GUIDE FOR VOTERS BY CITIZENS UNION in NYT on October 28, 1917
 New York Red Book (1918; pg. 166)
 NOMINEES ANALYZED BY CITIZENS UNION in NYT on October 27, 1918
 ELMER ROSENBERG in NYT on April 12, 1951 (subscription required)
 Looking Back For a Future In the Catskills in NYT on May 8, 1997
 Deaths; BLUMBERG, ESTERITA (CISSIE) in NYT on September 7, 2004

1880s births
1951 deaths
American trade union leaders
Socialist Party of America politicians from New York (state)
Members of the New York State Assembly
Austro-Hungarian emigrants to the United States
People from Cochecton, New York
20th-century American politicians
Activists from New York (state)